Curt Larsson (born December 11, 1944) is a Swedish former professional ice hockey goaltender.

Between 1974 and 1977, Larsson played 68 games in the World Hockey Association (WHA) with the Winnipeg Jets.

References

External links

1944 births
Living people
Södertälje SK players
Swedish ice hockey goaltenders
Winnipeg Jets (WHA) players
People from Nyköping Municipality
Sportspeople from Södermanland County